John Henry Hughes (April 1, 1904 – October 13, 1972) was an American lawyer and politician from New York.

Life
He was born on April 1, 1904 in Syracuse, New York. He graduated from Syracuse University, and in 1928 from Syracuse University College of Law. He was admitted to the bar in 1929, and practiced law in Syracuse. He married Mary Lorraine Porter (1914–1976), and they had three children.

Hughes was a member of the New York State Senate from 1947 until his death in 1972, sitting in the 166th, 167th, 168th, 169th, 170th, 171st, 172nd, 173rd, 174th, 175th, 176th, 177th, 178th and 179th New York State Legislatures. He was Chairman of the Committee on the Judiciary from 1966 to 1972.

He was an alternate delegate to the 1948, 1952, 1956, 1960 and 1964 Republican National Conventions.

He died on October 13, 1972; and was buried at St. Mary's Cemetery in DeWitt, New York.

References

1904 births
1972 deaths
Republican Party New York (state) state senators
Politicians from Syracuse, New York
Syracuse University College of Law alumni
20th-century American politicians
Lawyers from Syracuse, New York
20th-century American lawyers